Andrius Gudžius (born 14 February 1991) is a Lithuanian discus thrower. Gudzius won the gold at the 2017 World Championships.

He had his first national placing at the 2008 Lithuanian Athletics Championships, where he was third with 53.52 m. Two years later, the teenage Gudžius improved to second at the Lithuanian Championships with 60.98 m. He won the gold medal at the 2018 European Championships.

Gudzius has a personal best of 69.59 m.

International competitions

References

1991 births
Living people
Sportspeople from Kaunas
Lithuanian male discus throwers
Olympic athletes of Lithuania
Athletes (track and field) at the 2016 Summer Olympics
World Athletics Championships athletes for Lithuania
World Athletics Championships medalists
Universiade medalists in athletics (track and field)
Universiade bronze medalists for Lithuania
Competitors at the 2011 Summer Universiade
European Athletics Championships winners
World Athletics Championships winners
Diamond League winners
Medalists at the 2015 Summer Universiade
Athletes (track and field) at the 2020 Summer Olympics
20th-century Lithuanian people
21st-century Lithuanian people